Claude Cohen-Tannoudji (born 1 April 1933) is a French physicist. He shared the 1997 Nobel Prize in Physics with Steven Chu and William Daniel Phillips for research in methods of laser cooling and trapping atoms. Currently he is still an active researcher, working at the École normale supérieure (Paris).

Early life
Cohen-Tannoudji was born in Constantine, French Algeria, to Algerian Jewish parents Abraham Cohen-Tannoudji and Sarah Sebbah. When describing his origins Cohen-Tannoudji said: "My family, originally from Tangier, settled in Tunisia and then in Algeria in the 16th century after having fled Spain during the Inquisition. In fact, our name, Cohen-Tannoudji, means simply the Cohen family from Tangiers. The Algerian Jews obtained the French citizenship in 1870 after Algeria became a French colony in 1830."

After finishing secondary school in Algiers in 1953, Cohen-Tannoudji left for Paris to attend the École Normale Supérieure. His professors included Henri Cartan, Laurent Schwartz, and Alfred Kastler.

In 1958 he married Jacqueline Veyrat, a high school teacher, with whom he has three children. His studies were interrupted when he was conscripted into the army, in which he served for 28 months (longer than usual because of the Algerian War). In 1960 he resumed working toward his doctorate, which he obtained from the École Normale Supérieure under the supervision of Alfred Kastler and Jean Brossel at the end of 1962.

Career

After his dissertation, he started teaching quantum mechanics at the University of Paris. From 1964-67, he was an associate professor at the university and from 1967-1973 he was a full professor. His lecture notes were the basis of the popular textbook, Mécanique quantique, which he wrote with two of his colleagues.  He also continued his research work on atom-photon interactions, and his research team developed the model of the dressed atom.

In 1973, he became a professor at the Collège de France. In the early 1980s, he started to lecture on radiative forces on atoms in laser light fields. He also formed a laboratory there with Alain Aspect, Christophe Salomon, and Jean Dalibard to study laser cooling and trapping. He even took a statistical approach to laser cooling with the use of stable distributions.

In 1976, he took sabbatical leave from the Collège de France, and lectured at Harvard University and MIT. At Harvard, he was a Loeb Lecturer for two weeks, and at MIT, he was a visiting professor. 

His work eventually led to the Nobel Prize in physics in 1997 "for the development of methods to cool and trap atoms with laser light", shared with Steven Chu and William Daniel Phillips. Cohen-Tannoudji was the first physics Nobel prize winner born in an Arab country. 

In 2015, Cohen-Tannoudji signed the Mainau Declaration 2015 on Climate Change on the final day of the 65th Lindau Nobel Laureate Meeting. The declaration was signed by a total of 76 Nobel Laureates and handed to then-President of the French Republic, François Hollande, as part of the successful COP21 climate summit in Paris.

Awards

1979 – Young Medal and Prize,  for distinguished research in the field of optics.
1991 – Research Award of Alexander von Humboldt Foundation
1993 – Charles Hard Townes Award
1994 – honorary doctorate from the Faculty of Science and Technology at Uppsala University, Sweden
1996 – Quantum Electronics Prize of the European Physical Society
1996 – CNRS Gold medal
1997 – Nobel Prize, for the development of methods to cool and trap atoms with laser light.
2010 – Legion of Honour

Selected works 
The main works of Cohen-Tannoudji are given in his homepage.

 Claude Cohen-Tannoudji, Bernard Diu, and Frank Laloë. 1973. Mécanique quantique. 2 vols. Collection Enseignement des Sciences. Paris.  (Quantum Mechanics. Vol. I & II, 1991. Wiley, New-York,  & ).
 Claude Cohen-Tannoudji, Gilbert Grynberg and Jacques Dupont-Roc. Introduction à l'électrodynamique quantique. (Photons and Atoms: Introduction to Quantum Electrodynamics. 1997.  Wiley. )
 Claude Cohen-Tannoudji, Gilbert Grynberg and Jacques Dupont-Roc, Processus d'interaction photons-atomes. (Atoms-Photon Interactions : Basic Processes and Applications. 1992. Wiley, New-York. )
 Claude Cohen-Tannoudji. 2004. Atoms in Electromagnetic fields. 2nd Edition. World Scientific. Collection of his most important papers.

See also
 List of Jewish Nobel laureates

References

External links 

His research group
His lecture notes (in French)
 including his Nobel Lecture, December 8, 1997 Manipulating Atoms with Photons

1933 births
Living people
Nobel laureates in Physics
French Nobel laureates
People from Constantine, Algeria
20th-century French Sephardi Jews
21st-century French Sephardi Jews
Academic staff of the Collège de France
French physicists
Optical physicists
Laser researchers
École Normale Supérieure alumni
Members of the Brazilian Academy of Sciences
Foreign associates of the National Academy of Sciences
Foreign Members of the Russian Academy of Sciences
Recipients of the Great Cross of the National Order of Scientific Merit (Brazil)
Massachusetts Institute of Technology staff
Members of the Pontifical Academy of Sciences
Members of the French Academy of Sciences
Foreign Fellows of the Indian National Science Academy
Jewish physicists
Mizrahi Jews
Articles containing video clips
Fellows of the American Physical Society
Recipients of the Matteucci Medal